The 1912 United States presidential election in Alabama took place on November 5, 1912, as part of the 1912 United States presidential election. Alabama voters chose twelve representatives, or electors, to the Electoral College, who voted for president and vice president.

Alabama was won by Princeton University President Woodrow Wilson (D–New Jersey), running with governor of Indiana Thomas R. Marshall, with 69.94% of the popular vote, against the 26th president of the United States Theodore Roosevelt (P–New York), running with governor of California Hiram Johnson, with 19.24% of the popular vote and the 27th president of the United States William Howard Taft (R–Ohio), running with Columbia University President Nicholas Murray Butler, with 8.24% of the popular vote.

Results

Results by county

See also
United States presidential elections in Alabama

Notes

References

Alabama
1912
1912 Alabama elections